James Lincoln Collier (born June 29, 1928) is an American journalist, professional musician, jazz commentator, and author. Many of his non-fiction titles focus on music theory and the history of jazz.  

He and his brother Christopher Collier, a history professor, together wrote several works of fiction for children and young adults. 

They also co-authored about a dozen books on American history.

Bibliography
On music and jazz
Practical Music Theory: How music is put together from Bach to rock (1970)
Jug Bands and Handmade Music: A creative approach to music theory and the instruments (1973)
 
Louis Armstrong. An American Genius (1983)
Duke Ellington (1987)
Reception of Jazz in America (1988)
Benny Goodman and the Swing Era (1989)
Jazz: The American Theme Song (1993)
Jazz: An American Saga (1997)
 The New Grove Dictionary of Music and Musicians (1980 to present), contributor of entries on jazz and jazz-related subjects

For children and young adults
Which Musical Instrument Shall I Play? (1969)
Inside Jazz (1973)
The Great Jazz Artists (1977)

Fiction for children and young adults, by the Collier brothers
The Teddy Bear Habit (1967), about an insecure boy whose beatnik guitar teacher turns out to be a crook
My Brother Sam Is Dead (1974) – one of Newbery Medal runners-up; one of National Book Award finalists 
Rich and Famous (1975), sequel to The Teddy Bear Habit. 
Chipper (2001), about a young boy in a gang. 
The Empty Mirror (2004), 

American history series, by the Collier brothers
Decision in Philadelphia (1987)
The French and Indian War (1998)
Slavery and the coming of the Civil War (2000)
Progressivism, the Great Depression, and the New Deal (2001)

Controversy
In July 2014, Collier stirred controversy when his article "Nigger in the White House" was published in WestView News, a West Village newspaper. The article is critical of perceived racism in the far-right's opposition to President Barack Obama.

References

External links

Random House biography and works
Collier and Collier Teacher Resource File
James Lincoln Collier: Biography from Answers.com 
 
 
 Charles Williams at LC Authorities (no records) – a pseudonym used by Collier

1928 births
Living people
American male journalists
American music critics
American children's writers
Hamilton College (New York) alumni
Newbery Honor winners
20th-century American novelists
21st-century American novelists
American male novelists
20th-century American male writers
21st-century American male writers
20th-century American non-fiction writers
21st-century American non-fiction writers